Haakon VII (1872–1957) was King of Norway from 1905 to 1957.

Haakon VII or King Haakon VII or variation, may also refer to:

Ships
 HNoMS King Haakon VII, a Royal Norwegian Navy escort ship in commission from 1942 to 1951
 HNoMS Haakon VII (A537), a Royal Norwegian Navy training ship in commission from 1958 to 1974

Places

Norway
 Haakon VII Land, Spitsbergen, Svalbard, Norway
 Haakon VII street, Trondheim, Norway
 Haakon VII Toppen (Haakon VII Peak), a peak on Beerenberg, Jan Mayan, Norway

Antarctica
 King Haakon VII Vidde (Haakon VII Plateau), a plateau in Antarctica
 King Haakon VII Sea, East Antarctica, Southern Ocean

See also

 
 Haakon (disambiguation)